Mother of the Sun is the eleventh studio album by American rock band Jefferson Starship. It was released on August 22, 2020, through Golden Robot Records.

Production
This is the first album from the band to not include any contributions from founder Paul Kantner, who died in 2016. This is also the first studio album from the band in 36 years to include former bassist Pete Sears, who plays on three tracks on the album. After the recording of their last studio album, Jefferson's Tree of Liberty (2008), drummer Prairie Prince departed from the group and was replaced by 1982–84 drummer Donny Baldwin to perform on the tour. Baldwin, who had also performed with the offshoot band Starship from 1984 to 1989, has remained with Jefferson Starship since, and this is his first album with the group since 1984's Nuclear Furniture.

The first single from the album, "It's About Time", was co-written by co-founder and former vocalist Grace Slick, and "Don't Be Sad Anymore" was written by former vocalist Marty Balin, who died in 2018. A live rendition of Jorma Kaukonen's instrumental "Embryonic Journey", is featured on the album.

Reception
The album garnered mixed reviews from professional critics, but a generally positive response from fans. Stephen Thomas Erlewine of Allmusic said of the album "Whether it's a rocker or a ballad (and there are more of the latter than the former), almost everything on Mother of the Sun is overblown in a manner that's specific to the mid-'80s, when AOR airwaves were littered with '60s veterans flexing their muscles in an attempt to sound relevant." Many others noted this detail as a fault, but most praised the relatively uncharacteristic style of the album as being compatible with staying near their roots in the 1960s era San Francisco Sound.

Track listing

Personnel 
Adapted from liner notes.

Jefferson Starship
 Cathy Richardson – lead (1, 2, 4, 7) and backing vocals, rhythm guitar (1, 3, 7)
 David Freiberg – lead (3, 6) and backing vocals, rhythm guitar (1–4, 7)
 Jude Gold – lead guitar (1–5, 7), backing vocals
 Chris Smith – keyboards (1–4, 6, 7)
 Donny Baldwin – drums (1–4, 7), backing vocals

Additional musicians
 Pete Sears – bass (1, 3, 4)
 Greg Panciera – bass (2, 7), shaker (1)
 China Kantner – backing vocals (4)

Production 
 Jefferson Starship – producer
 Greg Panciera – mixing
 Greg Calbi – mastering
 Jason Reed, David Freiberg, Jono Brown, Thomas Woodfill, Jeff Tamalier, Peter Deleon, Cathy Richardson, Jude Gold – recording
 Nicholas Mohler – cover artwork
 Kevin Baldes – photography
 Hendrix Richardson – boy on cover

Space imagery courtesy of NASA.

References

External links
 Jefferson Starship to Release 'Mother of the Sun' Album

2020 albums
Jefferson Starship albums